Barnard is a lunar impact crater that is located near the eastern limb of the Moon. It is attached to the southeast rim of the large crater Humboldt, and Abel lies directly to the south. To the northeast is the crater Curie, while to the southeast is the Mare Australe.

The formation has been reshaped and distorted by nearby impacts. The interior is irregular, with an intrusion into the southwest rim and rugged formations particularly in the southern half. A matched pair of small craterlets lies near the center of the interior floor.

Satellite craters
By convention these features are identified on lunar maps by placing the letter on the side of the crater midpoint that is closest to Barnard.

References

External links
 

Impact craters on the Moon